Jaspal Singh is an Indian singer who lent his voice to various Bollywood actors of 1970's and 1980's. He was born on 23rd March, 1943 in Amritsar, Punjab. Jaspal Singh from a very young age and during his school and colleges days, he used to sing in various singing competitions. To further pursue his passion for singing he went to Mumbai where his sister used to stay. His talent was first and foremost recognised by well known female singer Usha Khanna during 1968. He was provided a chance to sing at a Professional level, however he did not get the recognition which he deserved. He struggled to make a career in singing and would often visit Amritsar, Delhi and Mumbai time and again. Due to pressure from his father he started practising law and started living in Mumbai. In spite of the hardships he never gave up. And then, a well known Music Composer, Ravindra Jain gave him the big break for a song in the movie called 'Geet Gata Chal' of 1975. After this song, he became a household name. His voice was unique and was unlike any other and he sang for hit movies like 'Nadiya ke paar', Ankhiyon ke jharokhon se','Sawan ko aane do' amongst others.

Songs
Here is list of Jaspal Singh hit songs from Indian films

References

External links

Living people
Indian male singers
Year of birth missing (living people)
Place of birth missing (living people)
Indian Sikhs